Nitibe is a small town in Nitibe subdistrict, in the East Timor exclave of Oecusse. It is located inland in the west of the exclave.

References 
 Wheeler, T. (2004) East Timor. Footscray, VIC: Lonely Planet.

Populated places in Oecusse